Neoboletus praestigator, also previously known as Neoboletus luridiformis, Boletus luridiformis and (invalidly) as Boletus erythropus, is a fungus of the bolete family, all of which produce mushrooms with tubes and pores beneath their caps. It is found in Northern Europe and North America, and is commonly known as the scarletina bolete, for its red pores (yellow when young). Other common names is: red foot bolete, dotted stemmed bolete, dotted stem bolete.

Whilst edible when cooked properly, it can cause gastric upset if raw.   Where the two species coincide it can be confused with the poisonous Rubroboletus satanas, which has a paler cap.

Taxonomy
In 1796 Christian Hendrik Persoon described Boletus erythropus, deriving its specific name from the Greek ερυθρος ("red") and πους ("foot"), referring to its red-coloured stalk. During the next 200 years or so, this name was used extensively for the species which is the subject of this article, and which (as well as a red stalk) has red pores.  Recently it was discovered however that Persoon's mushroom had orange pores, and was a different species (actually thought to be Suillellus queletii). So the use of this name for the red-pored mushroom was invalid.

In 1844 Friedrich Wilhelm Gottlieb Rostkovius independently defined the red-pored species under the name Boletus luridiformis. That is now the first valid description of the taxon and is the basis of the current name (the basionym). The significance of the epithet "luridiformis" is that it is similar to the previously known fungus Boletus luridus (now Suillellus luridus).

Genetic analysis published in 2013 showed that B. luridiformis and many (but not all) red-pored boletes were part of a dupainii clade (named for Boletus dupainii), well-removed from the core group of Boletus edulis and relatives within the Boletineae. This indicated that it needed to be placed in a new genus.  It became the type species of the new genus Neoboletus in 2014.

To avoid confusion, the name Boletus erythropus should now be avoided if possible (though in theory it still has a legitimate meaning as whatever species Persoon originally intended). It is not a valid synonym of Neoboletus luridiformis, and that can be indicated by using the term sensu auct. in place of the author name (that is, Boletus erythropus sensu auct. = Neoboletus luridiformis (Rostk.) Gelardi, Simonini & Vizzini).

Description

It has small orange-red pores that become rusty with age, and bruise blue to black. The tubes are yellowish-green, and become blue quickly on cutting. The flesh stains dark blue when bruised; broken, or cut. There is little smell. The spore dust is olive greenish-brown.

Similar species
Suillellus luridus has a network pattern on the stem, and seems to prefer chalky soil. 
Rubroboletus satanas also has a stem network, but a very-pale whitish cap.
Rubroboletus pulcherrimus has a reticulate stipe, and is larger in size.
Rubroboletus dupainii has a reddish cap.
Rubroboletus lupinus
Imperator rhodopurpureus prefers neutral soil.

Distribution and habitat
The fungus is common in Europe, growing in deciduous or coniferous woodland in summer and autumn.  It is often found in the same places as Boletus edulis. It is also widely distributed in North America, and is especially common under spruce in its range from Northern California to Alaska. In Eastern North America it grows with both soft, and hardwood trees.  It seems to prefer acid soils.

Toxicity and edibility
Mild tasting, Neoboletus praestigator is edible after longer cooking (some literature recommends 20 minutes). It is commonly collected in several European countries.

When raw or insufficiently cooked it can cause gastric upset, for the same reason it is not recommended for drying. Caution is advised as it resembles other less edible blue-staining boletes, and should thus be avoided by novice mushroom hunters.

References

External links
 

luridiformis
Fungi described in 1844
Fungi of Europe
Fungi of North America